"If I Lost You" is a song co-written and recorded by American country music artist Travis Tritt.  It was released in August 1998 as the first single from the album No More Looking Over My Shoulder.  The song reached #29 on the Billboard Hot Country Singles & Tracks chart.  The song was written by Tritt and Stewart Harris.

Chart performance

References

1998 singles
1998 songs
Travis Tritt songs
Songs written by Stewart Harris
Songs written by Travis Tritt
Song recordings produced by Billy Joe Walker Jr.
Warner Records singles